Laurel-Snow State Natural Area is a Tennessee Class II Natural-Scientific State Natural Area located in Rhea County, Tennessee, near Dayton, on Walden Ridge of the Cumberland Plateau. The  area is owned by the State of Tennessee and managed by the Tennessee Department of Environment and Conservation. It is a component of the Cumberland Trail, a linear park.

The Laurel-Snow trail within the natural area was the first National Recreation Trail designated in Tennessee.

The Laurel-Snow State Natural Area got its name from two of the four waterfalls in the area, the  Laurel Falls
and the  Snow Falls.

A  portion of the area was formerly a Bowater pocket wilderness.

References

External links
 

Waterfalls of Tennessee
Protected areas of Rhea County, Tennessee
Nature reserves in Tennessee
Landforms of Rhea County, Tennessee